Chiniak (Cing’iyak in Alutiiq) is a census-designated place (CDP) in Kodiak Island Borough, Alaska, United States. The population was 47 at the 2010 census, down from 50 in 2000.

Geography
Chiniak is located at  (57.610603, -152.199817).

Climate

Demographics

Chiniak first appeared on the 1880 U.S. Census as an unincorporated Inuit Village of 24 persons (all Inuit). It was likely abandoned some point soon after, as it did not appear on the 1890 census or until 100 years later in 1990, after the area was resettled by non-natives and made a census-designated place.

As of the census of 2000, there were 50 people, 24 households, and 13 families residing in the CDP. The population density was 1.2 people per square mile (0.5/km2). There were 32 housing units at an average density of 0.8/sq mi (0.3/km2). The racial makeup of the CDP was 88.00% White, 2.00% Native American, 2.00% Asian, 6.00% from other races, and 2.00% from two or more races. 8.00% of the population were Hispanic or Latino of any race.

There were 24 households, out of which 25.0% had children under the age of 18 living with them, 45.8% were married couples living together, and 41.7% were non-families. 37.5% of all households were made up of individuals, and 8.3% had someone living alone who was 65 years of age or older. The average household size was 2.08 and the average family size was 2.71.

In the CDP, the population was spread out, with 18.0% under the age of 18, 6.0% from 18 to 24, 14.0% from 25 to 44, 56.0% from 45 to 64, and 6.0% who were 65 years of age or older. The median age was 49 years. For every 100 females, there were 194.1 males. For every 100 females age 18 and over, there were 173.3 males.

The median income for a household in the CDP was $14,167, and the median income for a family was $75,067. Males had a median income of $51,250 versus $0 for females. The per capita income for the CDP was $22,211. There were no families and 20.0% of the population living below the poverty line, including no under eighteens and none of those over 64.

Community
Electricity, telephones, running water are available, as well as a paved highway most of the way to the village. The town has a school, post office, and library.

The Chiniak School, a K-12 rural school, is operated by the Kodiak Island Borough School District. Elaine Griffin, a kindergarten through 10th grade teacher at Chiniak School, received the 1995 Milken Educator Award for National Teacher of the Year.

See also

 List of census-designated places in Alaska

References

External links

Census-designated places in Alaska
Census-designated places in Kodiak Island Borough, Alaska
Populated coastal places in Alaska on the Pacific Ocean